Baxteria is a genus of flowering plant in the Dasypogonaceae described as a genus in 1843.  There is only one known species, Baxteria australis,  found only in the southwestern part of Western Australia.

References

Dasypogonaceae
Monotypic commelinid genera
Angiosperms of Western Australia
Endemic flora of Southwest Australia